Nazareno Malegarie (born May 16, 1986) is an Argentine mixed martial artist, and a two-time BJJ World Champion currently competing in the Featherweight division of the Professional Fighters League. A professional MMA competitor since 2007, he has also competed for the UFC, Bellator and Pancrase.

Background
Malegarie grew up in Buenos Aires, Argentina where he began learning Judo when he was only four-years-old and later Tae kwon do at the age of seven.

He was Judo Champion in Argentina in 1999 and 2000.

Brazilian Jiu-Jitsu
In 2001, after his family moved to Brazil, he started training in Brazilian Jiu-Jitsu, winning  the  2003 and 2004 Brazilian Jiu Jitsu World Championships in the blue belt division, South American and state tournaments. In BJJ he holds a notable victory over the four time BJJ World Champion and UFC fighter Gilbert "Durinho" Burns. After earning his blackbelt he made the leap into mixed martial arts, when he began training alongside UFC veteran Thiago Tavares, who inspired him to consider a career in MMA.

Mixed martial arts career

Early career
Malergarie currently trains at the Ataque Duplo Gym in Brazil. After his MMA debut in 2007, Nazareno fought in many MMA organizations in Brazil and Puerto Rico, where he finished 17 of his 19 victories by knockout or submission as a professional.

Bellator MMA
At Bellator 37, Malegarie fought Daniel Mason-Straus in the quarter finals of the Bellator Season Four Featherweight Tournament. Despite a noble effort, fighting a war for three rounds, Straus received the unanimous decision, eliminating Malegarie from the tournament and giving him his first career loss.

After his loss to Straus, Malergarie went back to the gym to work on his wrestling techniques for a possible rematch. His improved wrestling and ground skills showed during his fight with Jacob DeVree at Bellator 46, which he won by third round submission.

Malegarie competed in the opening round of the Bellator season seven featherweight tournament.  He faced Rad Martinez in the quarter finals at Bellator 76 and lost via unanimous decision.

The Ultimate Fighter: Brazil
Malegarie participated in The Ultimate Fighter: Brazil 4. He entered the house by defeating Edson Pereira via unanimous decision.  In the semi-finals, Malegarie lost to Fernando Bruno by unanimous decision.

Ultimate Fighting Championship
Malegarie made his promotional debut on September 5, 2015 at UFC 191 against fellow TUF Brazil competitor Joaquim Silva.  He lost the fight via split decision.

Grappling career
 Two-time Brazilian Jiu-Jitsu World Champion
 2003
 2004: blue belt, featherweight
 South American Brazilian Jiu-Jitsu Champion (2006 or 2007)
 Two-time Argentinean Judo Champion (1999-2000)

Mixed martial arts record

|-
|Loss
|align=center|34–6–1
|Isao Kobayashi
|Decision (unanimous)
|Pancrase: 305
|
|align=center|5
|align=center|5:00
|Tokyo, Japan
|
|-
|Draw
|align=center|34–5–1
|Steven Siler
|Draw (majority) 
|PFL 8
|
|align=center|2
|align=center|5:00
|New Orleans, Louisiana, United States
|
|-
|Loss
|align=center|34–5
|Andre Harrison
|Decision (unanimous)
|PFL 4
|
|align=center| 3
|align=center| 5:00
|Uniondale, New York, United States 
| 
|-
|Win
|align=center|34–4
|Marcos Galvão
|Decision (unanimous)
|PFL 1
|
|align=center| 3
|align=center| 5:00
|New York City, New York, United States 
| 
|-
|Win
|align=center|33–4
|Issei Tamura
|Submission (rear-naked choke)
|Pancrase: 285
|
|align=center|1
|align=center|2:50
|Tokyo, Japan
|
|-
|Win
|align=center|32–4
|Jose Carlos Soares
|Decision (unanimous)
|SMASH Fight 4
|
|align=center|3
|align=center|5:00
|Curitiba, Brazil
|
|-
|Win
|align=center|31–4
|Guy Delumeau
|Decision (unanimous)
|Pancrase: 281
|
|align=center|3
|align=center|5:00
|Tokyo, Japan
|
|-
|Win
|align=center|30–4
|Hiroyuki Takaya
|Decision (unanimous)
|Pancrase: 278
|
|align=center|3
|align=center|5:00
|Tokyo, Japan
|
|-
|Win
|align=center|29–4
|Iramar Frota
|Technical Submission (guillotine choke)
|Aspera Fighting Championship 34
|
|align=center|1
|align=center|0:34
|Ceara, Brazil
|
|-
|Loss
|align=center|28–4
|Joaquim Silva
|Decision (split)
|UFC 191
|
|align=center|3
|align=center|5:00
|Las Vegas, Nevada, United States
|
|-
| Win
| align=center| 28–3
| Derinaldo Guerra 
| Submission (arm-triangle choke)
| Arena Tour
| 
| align=center| 1
| align=center| 2:50
| Buenos Aires, Argentina
|Return to Featherweight.
|-
| Win
| align=center| 27–3
| Vitor Pastoriza
| Submission (standing guillotine)
| Arena Tour
| 
| align=center| 1
| align=center| 0:24
| Buenos Aires, Argentina
| 
|-
| Win
| align=center| 26–3
| Andre Luis de Souza
| Submission (guillotine choke)
| Smash: Smash Fight
| 
| align=center| 1
| align=center| 2:27
| Curitiba, Brazil
|Bantamweight debut.
|-
| Win
| align=center| 25–3
| José Ivanildo 
| Decision (unanimous)
| Sao Jose Super Fight 3
| 
| align=center| 3
| align=center| 5:00
| São José, Brazil
| 
|-
| Win
| align=center| 24–3
| Moisés Monteiro
| TKO (punches)
| Tavares Combat 5
| 
| align=center| 1
| align=center| 00:34
| Jaguaruna, Brazil
| 
|-
| Win
| align=center| 23–3
| Marcelo Alalau
| KO (head kick)
| Tavares Combat 4
| 
| align=center| 1
| align=center| 0:17
| Antônio Carlos, Brazil
| 
|-
| Loss
| align=center| 22–3
| Rad Martinez
| Decision (unanimous)
| Bellator 76
| 
| align=center| 3
| align=center| 5:00
| Windsor, Ontario, Canada
| 
|-
| Win
| align=center| 22–2
| Thiago Sinistro
| TKO (punches)
| IMMAF: Imbituba MMA Fight 2012
| 
| align=center| 1
| align=center| 1:44
| Imbituba, Brazil 
| 
|-
| Win
| align=center| 21–2
| Jonas Lis
| TKO (punches)
| Insano Empalux: Grand Prix 
| 
| align=center| 1
| align=center| 0:14
| São José, Brazil 
| 
|-
| Loss
| align=center| 20–2
| Marlon Sandro
| Decision (unanimous)
| Bellator 47 
| 
| align=center| 3
| align=center| 5:00
| Rama, Ontario, Canada
| 
|-
| Win
| align=center| 20–1
| Jacob DeVree
| Submission (guillotine choke)
| Bellator 46 
| 
| align=center| 3
| align=center| 1:25
| Hollywood, Florida, United States
| 
|-
| Loss
| align=center| 19–1
| Daniel Mason-Straus
| Decision (unanimous) 
| Bellator 37
| 
| align=center| 3
| align=center| 5:00
| Hollywood, Florida, United States
| 
|-
| Win
| align=center| 19–0
| Nelson Velasques
| Submission (rear-naked choke)
| Colizeu Fight Championship 
| 
| align=center| 1
| align=center| 4:48
| Joaçaba, Brazil
| 
|-
| Win
| align=center| 18–0
| Antonuce Conceicao
| Submission (guillotine choke)
| Memorial Fight Qualifying
| 
| align=center| 1
| align=center| N/A
| São Paulo, Brazil
| 
|-
| Win
| align=center| 17–0
| Ricardo Urbano
| TKO (punches)
| K.O. Fight 3
| 
| align=center| 2
| align=center| 2:10
| Apucarana, Brazil
| 
|-
| Win
| align=center| 16–0
| Daniel Morales
| Decision (unanimous)
| Top Combat Championship 2
| 
| align=center| 3
| align=center| 5:00
| San Juan, Puerto Rico
| 
|-
| Win
| align=center| 15–0
| Erick Carlos Silva
| Submission (anaconda choke)
| Nitrix Show Fight 4
| 
| align=center| 1
| align=center| 4:07
| Balneário Camboriú, Brazil
| 
|-
| Win
| align=center| 14–0
| Erickson Lima
| Submission (kimura)
| Jaragua Fight Combat
| 
| align=center| 1
| align=center| 2:40
| Jaraguá do Sul, Brazil
| 
|-
| Win
| align=center| 13–0
| Luciano Oliveira
| Submission (heel hook)
| Nitrix Show Fight 3
| 
| align=center| 1
| align=center| N/A
| Itajaí, Brazil
| 
|-
| Win
| align=center| 12–0
| Alessandro Corderio
| Submission (arm-triangle choke)
| VIP Stage 4
| 
| align=center| 3
| align=center| 1:32
| Joinville, Brazil
| 
|-
| Win
| align=center| 11–0
| Rafael Rodrigues
| Submission (heel hook)
| Jungle Fight 15
| 
| align=center| 3
| align=center| 1:51
| São Paulo, Brazil
| 
|-
| Win
| align=center| 10–0
| Vitor de Miranda
| KO (punches)
| Tavares Combat Qualifiers 
| 
| align=center| 1
| align=center| 0:54
| Florianópolis, Brazil
| 
|-
| Win
| align=center| 9–0
| Rosenildo Rocha
| Submission (rear-naked choke)
| VIP Stage 3
| 
| align=center| 2
| align=center| N/A
| Joinville, Brazil
| 
|-
| Win
| align=center| 8–0
| John Paine
| KO (punches)
| Spartan 1
| 
| align=center| 2
| align=center| 2:58
| Itapema, Brazil
| 
|-
| Win
| align=center| 7–0
| William Wolverine
| TKO (punches)
| Balneario Camboriu Fight
| 
| align=center| 1
| align=center| 4:34
| Balneário Camboriú, Brazil
| 
|-
| Win
| align=center| 6–0
| Diego Marlon
| Submission (guillotine choke)
| Warrior's Challenge 3  
| 
| align=center| 1
| align=center| N/A
| Itapema, Brazil
| 
|-
| Win
| align=center| 5–0
| Ruan Castil
| Submission (keylock)
| Dukeoom of Asgar
| 
| align=center| 1
| align=center| 2:13
| Florianópolis, Brazil
| 
|-
| Win
| align=center| 4–0
| Pablo Vinicius
| TKO (injury)
| Dukeoom of Asgar
| 
| align=center| 1
| align=center| 1:19
| Florianópolis, Brazil
| 
|-
| Win
| align=center| 3–0
| Jairon Oliveira
| Decision (unanimous)
| Floripa Fight 4
| 
| align=center| 3
| align=center| 5:00
| Florianópolis, Brazil
| 
|-
| Win
| align=center| 2–0
| Jonas Ribeiro
| Submission (guillotine choke)
| Full Fight Open Vale Tudo
| 
| align=center| 1
| align=center| 0:55
| Brazil
| 
|-
| Win
| align=center| 1–0
| Tarcisio Imegiato
| Submission (arm-triangle choke)
| Full Fight Open Vale Tudo
| 
| align=center| 1
| align=center| 0:36
| Brazil
|

References

External links

 

1986 births
Living people
Argentine male mixed martial artists
Featherweight mixed martial artists
Mixed martial artists utilizing judo
Mixed martial artists utilizing taekwondo
Mixed martial artists utilizing Luta Livre
Mixed martial artists utilizing Brazilian jiu-jitsu
Argentine practitioners of Brazilian jiu-jitsu
People awarded a black belt in Brazilian jiu-jitsu
Sportspeople from Florianópolis
Argentine male judoka
Argentine male taekwondo practitioners
Ultimate Fighting Championship male fighters